Below are the names and numbers of the steam locomotives that comprised the BR standard class 6, or 'Clan' Class that ran on the Scottish Region of British Railways' railway network.  They represented an attempt to regionalise some of the names of the standard pacifics, resulting in E.S. Cox's decision to name the class after the former Highland Railway's  outgoing Clan Class, designed by Christopher Cumming.

Locomotives as constructed

Unbuilt locomotives

A further 15 'Clans' was projected, but due to an acute shortage of steel, the order was frequently postponed until the advent of the British Railways Modernisation Plan, which led to the order being cancelled.  Five of the new locomotives were expected to operate on the Southern Region, and as such, a change in naming style was undertaken with the next five in series.  The final ten reverted to Scottish Region parlance.  The projected names were selected as thus:

Southern Region.

72010 Hengist,
72011 Horsa,
72012 Canute,
72013 Wildfire,
72014 Firebrand.

Scottish Region.

72015 Clan Colquhoun,
72016 Clan Graham,
72017 Clan MacDougall,
72018 Clan MacLean,
72019 Clan Douglas,
72020 Clan Gordon,
72021 Clan Hamilton,
72022 Clan Kennedy,
72023 Clan Lindsay,
72024 Clan Scott.

The names Hengist and Horsa had been used previously by BR on cross-channel Sealink ships.

New build

A start has been made on constructing a new locomotive of the missing batch of 15, number 72010 Hengist, being assembled at CTL Seal in Sheffield. This locomotive project constitutes the commencement of the 1000th locomotive build to a British Railways standard design.

Footnotes

References

 Burridge, Frank: Nameplates of the Big Four (Oxford Publishing Company: Oxford, 1975) 

6
BR standard class 6
Railway locomotives introduced in 1951
Br Clan Class Locomotives